Athanasios Petsalis (Parga, 1802 – 1871) was a Greek 19th century lawyer and politician who acted as a prefect and twice as a minister.

References 

Justice ministers of Greece
19th-century Greek lawyers
People from Parga
1802 births
1871 deaths
19th-century Greek politicians